Anicet Adalbert Kopliński (né Koplin; 30 July 1875 – 16 October 1941) was a Polish Capuchin friar of German descent and priest in Warsaw. He was imprisoned in the Nazi concentration camp at Auschwitz, where he died. He is one of the 108 Martyrs of World War II who were beatified by Pope John Paul II in 1999.

See also 
List of Nazi-German concentration camps
The Holocaust in Poland
World War II casualties of Poland

References

1875 births
1941 deaths
Polish people who died in Auschwitz concentration camp
Clergy from Warsaw
108 Blessed Polish Martyrs